The siege of Opochka was an unsuccessful attempt by the Grand Duchy of Lithuania and the Kingdom of Poland to conquer the Russian fortress of Opochka during the Fourth Muscovite–Lithuanian War.

References

Opochka
Opochka 
Opoc
Opochka
Mstislavl
Conflicts in 1517
Military history of Russia